Me and My Dick (A New Musical) contains the songs from the musical Me and My Dick, produced by StarKid Productions with music and lyrics by A.J. Holmes, Carlos Valdes, and Darren Criss, and book by Eric Kahn Gale, Brian Holden, Matt Lang, and Nick Lang. It was recorded by the musical's cast and was released digitally on January 6, 2010, through iTunes. The soundtrack became the first-ever student-produced college musical to reach Billboard, debuting at No. 11 on the Top Cast Albums chart.

Track listing

Personnel

Featured Performers

Band
 A.J. Holmes - piano
 Clark Baxtresser - keyboard
 Andy Warren - trumpet
 Ryan Proch - clarinet, alto saxophone
 Sam Crittenden - trombone
 Darren Criss - guitar
 Carlos Valdes - bass
 Jack Stratton - drums

Chart performance

Other appearances
 The alternate versions of "Ready to Go" and "Even Though" were also released on the A Very StarKid Album.

References

External links
 StarKid Productions official website
 Star Kid Productions on YouTube

StarKid Productions albums
Cast recordings
Theatre soundtracks
2010 soundtrack albums